Edmund Gregory may refer to:

Edmund Gregory (author) (fl. 1646), English author
Edmund B. Gregory (1882–1961), U.S. Army general